XHAVR-FM is a radio station on 89.1 FM in Alvarado, Veracruz, Mexico. It carries the news/talk programming of Radio Fórmula.

History
XEAVR-AM 1540 received its first concession on June 27, 1983. It was owned by Tomás Tejeda Lagos and broadcast as a 5 kW daytimer. In the 1990s, XEAVR was sold to Comunicación Radial del Golfo, S.A. de C.V. It also began broadcasting on 720 kHz with 10 kW day and 250 watts night.

XEAVR was transferred to the current concessionaire in 2007 and approved to migrate to FM in 2012.

References

1983 establishments in Mexico
News and talk radio stations in Mexico
Radio stations in Veracruz
Radio stations established in 1983
Radio Fórmula